Andrey Valeryevich Buyvolov (born 12 January 1987) is a Russian professional football player who plays as a centre-back for FC Atlant-Shakhtyor Peshelan.

Club career
He played as Tosno won the 2017–18 Russian Cup final against FC Avangard Kursk on 9 May 2018 in the Volgograd Arena.

Honours

Club
Tosno
 Russian Cup: 2017–18

Career statistics

References

External links
 
 
 

1987 births
Living people
People from Balakhninsky District
Russian footballers
Russia national football B team footballers
Association football defenders
FC Volga Nizhny Novgorod players
FC Tosno players
FC Baltika Kaliningrad players
FC SKA-Khabarovsk players
FC Yenisey Krasnoyarsk players
FC Shakhter Karagandy players
Russian Premier League players
Kazakhstan Premier League players
Russian expatriate footballers
Expatriate footballers in Kazakhstan
Sportspeople from Nizhny Novgorod Oblast